Beba is a Fondom with several village communities that form part of the Benakuma sub-division in the Menchum Valley of the Northwest region of Cameroon. The village is accessible by a motorable road while footpaths are used to join distinct communities). Beba Fondom residents claim that their people originated from Widikum in Momo Division. They moved to Bamenda's Ntarinkon Quarter, then Mbengwi Village, later migrated to Ntamecheh and finally settled at their present location.

Beba has a population of about 7,000 (2014) spread over the Nsoka, upper Mbekunyam, lower Mbekunyam, Ntadiabo, Muala, Mbamba, Shisong, Fombi, and Agah communities. Perhaps due to an exodus of males from rural areas of this region, over 80% of the current residents are women and children. In 1987, Beba's population was 1,504. By 2002, it had grown to 2,180 and reached 4,000 by 2009. However, some residents believe that the population is closer to 6,000.

The village is ruled by a Tribal Fon and his council of chiefs from the various villages. Hydro-electricity, and methods of modern communication are lacking in many areas of this community. Villagers must move up to high elevations, to make a phone call or receive FM radio signals.

In addition to traditional healers, the Catholic Mission has constructed a Health Centre at Lower Mbekunyam. The government's modern Health Centre at Mbamba is still to go operational. Most of the villages are well supplied by natural springs gushing out from the hills. At Mbamba where there is resettlement, a modern water catchment has been realized running from Ntsoboh to Shishong and can well reach Okoro.

Economics
Recent research conducted by IRR in the village shows that cocoa, coffee and palms are viable crops. Coco-yams, plantain Groundnuts and palms are currently cultivated in the village, and serve as the primary means of livelihood for its inhabitants.

References 

Populated places in Cameroon